Gabriel Travaglini (born 14 February 1958) is a former Argentinian rugby union player. He played as number 8. He played for CASI for all of his entire career.

Career
Travaglini debuted with Club Atlético San Isidro against Banco Nación, on September 1977, playing as lock. Between 1980 and 1986, Travaglini was the captain for CASI. His first match for Argentina was against Italy, on 24 October 1978. He was also part of the 1987 Rugby World Cup Pumas roster, playing all the three matches, ending his international career in the pool stage match against the All Blacks.
Currently he is CASI's chairman.

Notes

External links

1958 births
Living people
Argentine rugby union players
Rugby union number eights
Argentina international rugby union players